The 2009–10 Ligue 1 season was the 72nd since its establishment. Bordeaux were the defending champions. The fixtures were announced on 5 June 2009, and play commenced on 8 August and ended on 15 May 2010. There were three promoted teams from Ligue 2, replacing the three teams that were relegated from Ligue 1 following the 2008–09 season. A total of 20 teams competed in the league with three clubs suffering relegation to the second division, Ligue 2. All clubs that secured Ligue 1 status for this season were subject to approval by the DNCG before becoming eligible to participate. In addition, German sportswear company Puma became the official provider of match balls for the season after agreeing to a long term partnership with the Ligue de Football Professionnel.

The season began on 8 August 2009 under a new format with 16 clubs beginning play simultaneously followed by 4 clubs competing the following day. Under the new format, the showcase match of the opening week will contest the winners of the league the previous season and the winners of the second division the previous season. In the match this year, defending champions Bordeaux defeating second division champions Lens 4–1 at the Stade Chaban-Delmas.

On 5 May 2010, Marseille defeated Rennes 3–1 to claim their 9th Ligue 1 title and their first since the 1991–92 season. Because of their Coupe de la Ligue title, Marseille claimed the league and league cup double. It is the second straight season a club has won the league and league cup double with Bordeaux achieving it last season.

Teams

Promotion and relegation
Teams promoted from 2008–09 Ligue 2
 Champions: Lens
 Runners-up: Montpellier
 3rd Place: Boulogne

Teams relegated to 2009–10 Ligue 2
 18th Place: Caen
 19th Place: Nantes
 20th Place: Le Havre

Stadia and locations

Managers

Kits

Managerial changes

Transfers

League table

Results

Statistics

Top goalscorers
Mamadou Niang won the Trophée du Meilleur Buteur.

Last updated: 21 May 2010
Source: Règlement du classement des buteurs

Awards

Monthly awards

UNFP Player of the Month

Yearly awards
The nominees for the Player of the Year, Goalkeeper of the Year, Young Player of the Year, Manager of the Year and Goal of the Year in Ligue 1. The winner was determine at the annual UNFP Awards, which was held on 9 May. The winners are displayed in bold.

Player of the Year

Young Player of the Year

Goalkeeper of the Year

Manager of the Year

Goal of the Year

Team of the Year

Season statistics
Updated 11 April 2010

Scoring
First goal of the season: Mamadou Niang for Marseille against Grenoble, 1 minute and 34 seconds. (8 August 2009). 
Fastest goal in a match: 1 minute – Roland Lamah for Le Mans against Montpellier. (10 April 2010). 
Goal scored at the latest point in a match: 90+4 minutes and 27 seconds – Sloan Privat for Sochaux against Lens (7 November 2009) 
First own goal of the season: Olivier Monterrubio (Lorient) for Lille, 64 minutes and 38 seconds (9 August 2009)
First penalty kick of the season: 58 minutes and 44 seconds – Mathieu Coutadeur (scored) for Le Mans against Lyon (8 August 2009).
First hat-trick of the season: Michel Bastos (Lyon) against Sochaux (21 February 2010).
Widest winning margin: 5 goals  
Lorient 5–0 Boulogne (7 November 2009)
Grenoble 5–0 Auxerre (6 February 2010)
Most goals in one match: 10 goals – Lyon 5–5 Marseille (8 November 2009).
Most goals in one half: 6 goals  
Lyon v Marseille (8 November 2009); 2–2 at half time, 5–5 final.
Boulogne v Paris Saint-Germain (2 December 2009); 1–0 at half time, 2–5 final.

Discipline
First yellow card of the season: Sidney Govou for Lyon against Le Mans, 9 minutes and 24 seconds (8 August 2009) 
First red card of the season: Cyril Jeunechamp for Montpellier against Paris Saint-Germain, 32 minutes and 11 seconds (8 August 2009) 
Card given at latest point in a game: Nicolas Penneteau (red) at 90+3 minutes and 44 seconds for Valenciennes against Nancy (8 August 2009) 
Most yellow cards in a single match: 9 
Rennes 0–1 Auxerre – 4 for Rennes (Fabien Lemoine, Yann M'Vila, Asamoah Gyan, & Lucien Aubey) and 5 for Auxerre (Aurélien Capoue, Cédric Hengbart, Stéphane Grichting, Dennis Oliech, & Jean-Pascal Mignot) (3 October 2009)
Most red cards in a single match: 3 
Bordeaux 2–2 Lyon – 2 for Bordeaux (Benoît Trémoulinas and Jussiê) and 1 for Lyon (Anthony Réveillère) (17 April 2010)

Miscellaneous
Longest second half injury time: 5 minutes and 56 seconds – Lens against Lille (20 September 2009).
On 9 August 2009, Bordeaux established a record for most consecutive league wins with 12 surpassing Lille who won 11 consecutive matches in 1949, winning their last four games of the 1948–49 season and their first seven in the 1949–50 season. Bordeaux's streak began during the 2008–09 season on 14 March 2009 following a 2–1 victory over Nice. The club broke the record on the opening match day of this season defeating Lens 4–1. The record lasted for 14 matches before coming to an end on 30 August following the club's 0–0 draw with Marseille.
On 31 October 2009, Grenoble set a record for most consecutive losses in French football following the club's eleven straight league defeat, an 0–2 loss to Lille. The previous record of ten straight defeats, held by Sète, had been intact since 1947. The losing streak came to an end the following week, on 7 November, following the club's 0–0 draw with Monaco.

References

 

Ligue 1 seasons
France
1